Esteban Rodrigo Burgos (born 9 January 1992) is an Argentine footballer who plays for Spanish club Málaga CF as a central defender.

Club career

Argentina
Born in Salta, Burgos began his career with hometown club Gimnasia y Tiro, making his senior debut in 2011. After becoming a regular starter during the 2012–13 season, he joined Primera B Nacional side Talleres de Córdoba on 28 June 2013.

Burgos made his professional debut on 14 August 2013, starting in a 1–1 home draw against Club Atlético Douglas Haig. After again being first-choice, he signed for Godoy Cruz Antonio Tomba in Primera División on 10 July of the following year.

Burgos made his debut in the main category on 27 August 2014, starting in a 1–0 away win against Rosario Central. After featuring sparingly, he moved to the latter club on 5 January 2016, on an 18-month loan deal.

Alcorcón
On 7 July 2017 Burgos moved abroad for the first time in his career, after agreeing to a two-year deal with Segunda División side AD Alcorcón. He made his debut for the club on 19 August, starting in a 0–0 home draw against Sporting de Gijón.

Eibar
On 1 July 2019, free agent Burgos joined La Liga side SD Eibar, signing a three-year deal. He made his debut in the category on 14 December, replacing injured Pedro Bigas in a 0–0 away draw against Athletic Bilbao, and scored his first goal the following 18 January, netting the opener in a 2–0 home win over Atlético Madrid.

Málaga
On 15 July 2022, Burgos signed a two-year contract with Málaga CF in the second division.

Career statistics

Club

References

External links
 
 
 
 

1992 births
Living people
People from Salta
Argentine footballers
Association football defenders
Argentine Primera División players
Primera Nacional players
Gimnasia y Tiro footballers
Talleres de Córdoba footballers
Godoy Cruz Antonio Tomba footballers
Rosario Central footballers
Segunda División players
AD Alcorcón footballers
SD Eibar footballers
Málaga CF players
Argentine expatriate footballers
Argentine expatriate sportspeople in Spain
Expatriate footballers in Spain
Sportspeople from Salta Province